KFXX may refer to:

 KFXX (AM), a radio station (1080 AM) licensed to serve Portland, Oregon, United States
 KFXX-FM, a radio station (99.5 FM) licensed to serve Klamath Falls, Oregon
 KHGN (FM), a radio station (106.7 FM) licensed to serve Hugoton, Kansas, United States, which held the call signs KFXX or KFXX-FM from 1989 to 2016